Hans Gehrig (17 August 1929 – 1989) was a Canadian bobsledder. He competed at the 1968 Winter Olympics and the 1972 Winter Olympics.

References

1929 births
1989 deaths
Canadian male bobsledders
Olympic bobsledders of Canada
Bobsledders at the 1968 Winter Olympics
Bobsledders at the 1972 Winter Olympics
Sportspeople from Zürich